Sardar Bahadur was a title of honour awarded to native Indian civilians and Viceroy's commissioned officers during British rule in India. It was bestowed upon Sikhs, and was awarded for faithful service or acts of public welfare. The title was used after any military rank, but before the title holder's name. From 1911 holders of the title were also awarded a special Title Badge.

Members of the first class of the Order of British India could also use the title of Sardar Bahadur, with members of the second class using Bahadur.
The title of Sardar Bahadur was part of a wider honours system put in place by British India:

First Class
Dewan Bahadur, for Hindus;
Nawab Bahadur, for Muslims;
Second Class
Khan Bahadur, for Muslims;
Rai Bahadur, (North India) or Rao Bahadur (South India), for Hindus;
Third Class
Khan Sahib, for Muslims; 
Rai Sahib, (North India) or Rao Sahib (South India), for Hindus.

Those of other religions received the title considered most appropriate, for example native Indian Christians with a Hindu sounding name would receive a Hindu title.

In most cases a recipient proceeded from the lowest grade to a higher level, with only the most senior title used. Ranking below a knighthood, these titles were dropped by any holder who became a knight of a British Order, for example the Order of the Star of India or the Order of the Indian Empire.

Sardar Bahadur and similar titles issued during British Raj were dis-established in 1947 upon the independence of India.

Recipients 
 Sardar Bahadur Maharaj Jagat Singh Ji, third Master (Satguru) of Radha Soami Satsang Beas.

See also
Raj Ratna
Dewan
Title Badge (India)

References

Titles in India
Orders, decorations, and medals of British India
Men's social titles
Orders, decorations, and medals of India
Awards disestablished in 1947